Metropolitan Local Aboriginal Land Council (MetroLALC) is a Sydney-based organisation which works on issues surrounding Indigenous land rights. Formerly known as the Redfern Land Council, the organisation was established to facilitate developments in land rights cases following the passing of the Aboriginal Lands Right Act (1983).

A public artwork, entitled Gadigal Mural, reaching over 25 metres long and 17 meters high across the back of William House, was produced in consultation with the council.

References

External links
 MetroLALC
 ALC

1983 establishments in Australia
Organisations serving Indigenous Australians